, or simply Tennōzan, is a mountain in Ōyamazaki, Kyoto, Japan. The name originates from a shrine on the mountain dedicated to Gozutennō.

History 
Throughout history, the mountain was a place of great strategic importance due to its location. Many wars were fought on its sides, including the Battle of Yamazaki between Toyotomi Hideyoshi and Akechi Mitsuhide. Due to its strategic location the Japanese phrase  was born.

References

External links

Tennozan
History of Kyoto Prefecture
Yamashiro Province